Pattaya Boxing World is a stadium and organizer of Muay Thai events in Pattaya. The stadium holds Muay Thai competitions every day from 20:00 to 23:00. Pattaya Boxing World is partner of Fairtex Gym.

References

External links 
	

 
 

Indoor arenas in Thailand
Professional Muay Thai organizations
Muay Thai venues in Thailand
Sports venues in Thailand
Sports venues completed in 2012
2012 establishments in Thailand

Chonburi province